Broadway Boogie Woogie is a painting by Piet Mondrian completed in 1943, after he had moved to New York in 1940. Compared to his earlier work, the canvas is divided into many more squares. Although he spent most of his career creating abstract work, this painting is inspired by clear real-world examples: the city grid of Manhattan, and boogie-woogie, an African-American Blues music Mondrian loved. The painting was bought by the Brazilian sculptor Maria Martins for the price of $800 at the Valentine Gallery in New York City, after Martins and Mondrian both exhibited there in 1943. Martins later donated the painting to the Museum of Modern Art in New York City.

Analysis 
When Piet Mondrian arrived in New York he become fond of the neat, rigid architecture. He integrated the mood and tone of jazz into this work. Mondrian called it the “destruction of natural appearance; and construction through continuous opposition of pure means - dynamic rhythm.”

References

External links
 Broadway Boogie-Woogie in the MoMA Online Collection
 Explanation of Broadway Boogie Woogie by Michael Sciam

De Stijl
1943 paintings
Paintings by Piet Mondrian
Paintings in the collection of the Museum of Modern Art (New York City)